Piasala is a village and gram panchayat in Garhbeta II CD Block in Medinipur Sadar subdivision of Paschim Medinipur district  in the state of West Bengal, India.

Geography
The area lies south of the Shilabati and is close to Hoomgarh Forest.

Demographics
As per 2011 Census of India Piasala had a total population of 1,848 of which 955 (52%) were males and 893 (48%) were females. Population below 6 years was 211. The total number of literates in Piasala was 1,298 (67.19% of the population over 6 years).

.*For language details see Garhbeta II#Language and religion

Transport
The Garbeta-Hoomgarh-Goaltore-Pirakata Road passes through Piasala.

References

Villages in Paschim Medinipur district